Association football and politics are connected in club identities, clashes, and footballers who choose a career in politics.
Association football has played a role in maintaining the differences which give each European country a distinct identity, while strengthening the bonds that bind Europe together. According to Macon Benoit, European football underwent a massive transformation during the World War II era (1933–45). The game's sharp rise in popularity came at a time of high political intensity, leading to football's politicization. Benoit writes that during this period, European football began to embody four main characteristics: 1) an agent of international relations, in the sense that the foreign policies of European nations became articulated in matches; 2) a source of political propaganda, as football was used to build national pride and establish the legitimacy of political movements; 3) a tool for social pacification; football gave people a place to focus their energy that was not political, and 4) an avenue for protest; mass gatherings at matches gave spectators a forum for the expression of identity and political sentiments. European football stadiums have assumed other roles as places of refuge and sites of political uprisings and terrorist attacks. As European politics and relations have changed, football has remained a global means of political expression.

Three former footballers have led their countries: Ahmed Ben Bella, George Weah, and Kaj Leo Johannesen. Ben Bella played briefly for Marseille during the mid-1940s before leading Algeria in the aftermath of its war, first as prime minister and then as president. Weah, who played football for 18 years in Africa and Europe, was an unsuccessful candidate for the Liberian presidency in 2005 before his election in 2017. Johannesen, who played in goal four times for the Faroe Islands national football team during the 1990s, became prime minister of the Faroe Islands in 2008. Other footballers who have sought high political office include Albert Guðmundsson (who finished third in the 1980 Icelandic presidential election) and Oleg Malyshkin, who finished fifth in the 2004 Russian presidential elections.

Clubs and political identity
Some clubs have a fan base which is religious, right- or left-wing, nationalist, unionist, or autonomist.

England 
Although many clubs do not have a fixed political identity, some clubs have clear leanings. According to YouGov statistics, supporters of Sunderland lean left and often sing "The Red Flag" during marches. The hooligan firm Seaburn Casuals, on the other hand, is known for its far-right associations. When 26 Seaburn Casuals hooligans were arrested in a police raid before the 1998 FIFA World Cup, some were found to be involved with neo-Nazi groups such as Combat 18.

Some non-league clubs have been adopted by fans that are vocally opposed to racism, homophobia and other forms of discrimination. Examples include Clapton and Dulwich Hamlet. A breakaway from Clapton FC, named Clapton Community, have based their away shirt on the flag of the Spanish Second Republic, supported the October 2020 Polish protests, and reached out to refugees and LGBT people to feel welcome at football.

Northern Ireland and Scotland 
One of the largest and oldest football rivalries is the Old Firm rivalry between the Scottish clubs Celtic and Rangers. The competition between the two clubs is rooted in more than a sporting rivalry; it has as much to do with Northern Ireland as Scotland, as seen in the flags, cultural symbols, and emblems of both clubs. It was infused with a series of complex disputes centered on religion (Catholic and Protestant), Northern Ireland-related politics (loyalism and republicanism), national identity (British or Irish-Scots), or social ideology (conservatism and socialism). Although most Rangers and Celtic supporters are not actively sectarian, serious incidents sometimes occur and the actions of a minority dominate the headlines. The Old Firm rivalry fueled many assaults on Derby days, and some deaths have been directly related to the aftermath of Old Firm matches. An activist group which monitors sectarian activity in Glasgow has reported that on Old Firm weekends, violent attacks increase nine-fold above normal levels. An increase in domestic abuse can also be attributed to Old Firm matches.

Spain 

Many of the Spanish football rivalries outside the local derbies involve politics (ideological or geographical). The term morbo (roughly translating as morbid fascination and antagonism) has been used to describe attitudes to the complex network of identities and relationships between Spanish clubs. An informal system of alliances and enmities exists across the nation's hooligan groups, based on their political allegiance; the most prominent may be between Atlético Madrid's right-wing followers and the left-wing group attached to Sevilla. Sevilla is locally perceived as the middle-class club in the Seville derby, in contrast to working-class Real Betis. The largest ultras groups who follow Real Madrid and Barcelona (the two clubs in Spain's most famous rivalry, El Clásico) are right-wing. The hostility between them springs from their profiles as the symbolic representatives of Castile and Catalonia, which escalated under the Madrid-based ruling fascist regime of Francisco Franco during the mid-20th century and continued into the 21st, with many Barcelona supporters visibly sympathetic to the Catalan independence movement. As a result, the team is met with anger by other clubs' fans when they visit. Barcelona's claimed position as the persecuted team in their relationship with Madrid contrasts with their city rivalry with Espanyol, who are aligned towards Spanish unionism and whose owners see Barça as the club unfairly favored by Catalonian lawmakers. Real Madrid's rivalry with Athletic Bilbao, the most successful team in the Basque region, involves differences in culture and ideology; its competitive element has diminished in an era of global exposure and recruitment, however, due to Athletic's policy of using local players to emphasize pride in their origins.

Italy 
In Italy, the Derby della Capitale in Rome is often characterized by political tension. Some of Lazio's ultras used swastikas and fascist symbols on their banners, and they have engaged in racist behavior during the derbies. At a derby during the 1998–99 season, some laziali unfurled a 50-meter banner which read, "Auschwitz is your town, the ovens are your houses". Black players from A.S. Roma have often experienced racist and other offensive behavior. During the late 1970s, Lazio developed a strong rivalry with Pescara Calcio. The far-right Lazio ultras consider A.S. Livorno Calcio and Atalanta, both with strong left-wing leanings, to be among their ideological antagonists. Livorno also clashes with opposing right-wing supporter groups, especially those of Inter Milan and Verona. Lazio player Paolo Di Canio and his Livorno counterpart, Cristiano Lucarelli, have given controversial, ideological salutes to fans during matches.

Israel 
The Israeli club Beitar Jerusalem F.C. has far-right leanings, and are known for their refusal to allow Muslim-Arab players onto the club. Their most vocal supporters are the controversial, nationalist La Familia group. Fans chant anti-Arab and racist slogans in and outside the stadium, and the club has been penalized a number of times for their behavior. Their chief rival is the Hapoel Tel Aviv F.C., known for its left-wing leanings, and politics is the main impetus for their rivalry. Fans of the clubs often clash violently.

International level
A number of matches have ended in disputes and skirmishes.

El Salvador and Honduras 

The most infamous combination of politics and sport was the Football War between El Salvador and Honduras. Although the build-up to the war involved socioeconomic issues such as immigration and land reform, its impetus was hostility by rioters during the second North American qualifying round for the 1970 FIFA World Cup. Disturbances broke out during the first game in Tegucigalpa, and the second leg saw the situation worsen in San Salvador. Honduran fans were roughed up, the Honduran flag and national anthem were insulted, and the emotions of both nations ran high. In retaliation, violence against Salvadoran residents in Honduras (including several vice-consuls) increased. An unknown number of Salvadorans were killed or injured, and tens of thousands began to flee the country. The press of both countries contributed to a climate of near-hysteria and, on June 27, 1969, an attack against Honduras. The Organization of American States negotiated a cease-fire which took effect on July 20, with Salvadoran troops withdrawn in early August.

The Muslim and Arab World boycotting Israel 

Israel was one of the founding members of the AFC (Asian Football Confederation) after it became independent in 1948; before then, it played as Mandatory Palestine/Eretz Israel. After Israel's tense 0–1 loss to Iran in the final of the 1974 Asian Games in Iran, Kuwait and other Muslim and Arab countries refused to play them. Expelled from the confederation, Israel spent several years trying to qualify for the OFC (Oceania), before eventually joining UEFA (Europe) officially.

Falkland Islands 

In the 1986 Mexico World Cup, after the Falklands War between Argentina and the United Kingdom, Argentina and England met in the quarter-finals and Diego Maradona scored both goals in a 2–1 victory for the South Americans. Maradona attributed his first goal to the hand of God; his second goal has been called the Goal of the Century, and he said that the win was revenge for Argentina's defeat in the Falklands.

Iran and the U.S. 

At the 1998 FIFA World Cup in France, Iran recorded their first World Cup victory in the second game; they defeated the United States 2–1, with Hamid Estili and Mehdi Mahdavikia scoring the Iranian goals. Although tension was expected because of each country's political stance after the Iranian Revolution, both sides presented one another with gifts and flowers and stood together for a photograph before the match.

Japan and China 
The 2004 AFC Asian Cup in China made headlines due to events during the final between China and Japan, apparently because of relations between the countries dating back to the World War II era which included the Nanjing Massacre. As the Japanese national anthem was played, home fans expressed anti-Japanese sentiment by drowning out the anthem with chants. Chinese fans booed the players, visiting fans, and officials as Japan defeated China 3–1, rioting after the match outside the Beijing Workers' Stadium.

Iraq 
Despite ethnic dilemmas in their country, Iraq won the 2007 AFC Asian Cup. After a previous-round win, Iraqi military spokesman Qassim Moussawi said that they wanted to stop "terrorists, Sunni extremists, and criminals from targeting the joy of the people." Iraqi president Jalal Talabani said that it was disappointing that they could not celebrate at home with the fans. Many, however, hailed the victory as a show of unity; according to Iraq's coach, Jorvan Vieira, "This is not just about football ...this is more important than that ...This has brought great happiness to the whole country. This is not about a team, this is about human beings." Saudi coach Hélio dos Anjossaid, "Iraq deserved to win today ...They were very motivated and we knew the whole world was supporting this team."

Armenia and Turkey 
On September 6, 2008, Armenia and Turkey again faced each other in a 2010 FIFA World Cup qualification match in Yerevan. Turkish president Abdullah Gül was invited to watch the match, and he and his Armenian counterpart Serzh Sargsyan sat together behind bullet-proof glass. The Turkish national anthem was almost drowned out by booing from 35,000 Armenian fans, however, indicating continued mistrust between the countries. However, the gesture "between the presidents showed that they believed 'football diplomacy' had achieved the most important result." This was a first for the countries, which have been divided after the dissolution of the Ottoman Empire.

France and Ireland 

In 2009, France and the Republic of Ireland met in the 2010 FIFA World Cup qualification play-off; the winner of the two-legged tie progressed to the 2010 FIFA World Cup in South Africa. After a 1–1 aggregate draw, the match went into extra time at France's National Stadium. The winning goal came from France's William Gallas, but Thierry Henry twice handled the ball before passing to Gallas to score. It was called a "hand of Frog" goal, referring to Diego Maradona's "hand of God" goal in the 1986 World Cup match between Argentina and England. It then became an international incident with Irish Taoiseach Brian Cowen demanding a replay and the French President telling him to "stick to politics".

Iran and the UAE 
In 2010, relations between Iran and the United Arab Emirates took a turn for the worse when the Football Federation Islamic Republic of Iran sent a letter to the Asian Football Confederation complaining about the misuse of the Persian Gulf name. "The move was made after the UAE misrepresented the name Persian Gulf during a match between Iran's Sepahan and the UAE's Al Ain. The Emirate television displayed various banners showing a fictitious name for the Persian Gulf during the match between Iran's Sepahan and the UAE's Al Ain. In addition to comments from the UAE comparing the three disputed islands (Greater and Lesser Tunbs and Abu Musa, held by Iran) to the occupation of Palestine, calls were made to downgrade ties. This also comes after the Islamic Solidarity Games, to be held in Iran, were canceled over the dispute of the Persian Gulf label.

Gibraltar and Spain 
For the UEFA European Championship qualification, Gibraltar and Spain cannot be drawn together because of the disputed status of Gibraltar. The same rule is in place for Azerbaijan and Armenia because of poor relations between two countries, and it was imposed for Russia and Georgia after the 2008 Russo-Georgian War. However, it was lifted for the Euro 2016 tournament when Gibraltar and Spain agreed to play each other again.

Hungary and Romania

Footballer politicians

See also
 Politics and sports
 William Kennedy Gibson
 Oleg Malyshkin
 Nationalism and sport

References

Politics

Football